The 1957 Nutts Corner BEA Viscount crash was a British European Airways (BEA) flight from London to Belfast that crashed at Nutts Corner Airport on 23 October 1957, killing all seven passengers and crew.

Aircraft
The aircraft was a Vickers Viscount 802, registration G-AOJA, built and delivered to BEA the previous year. It was the first 800 Series Viscount built and was used by the manufacturer Vickers-Armstrongs for test and promotional flights prior to delivery.

Accident
On the afternoon of the accident the aircraft took off from London Heathrow Airport at 15:16 GMT on a non-scheduled positioning flight to Nutts Corner Airport in Belfast, Northern Ireland, where it was due to pick up the UK government Minister of Supply Aubrey Jones and a group of journalists, who had been attending the opening of a research building for Short & Harland Ltd in Belfast. An hour-and-a-half later, with low cloud and rain at Nutts Corner, the aircraft commenced its approach to land from the east on runway 28. As the aircraft neared the runway it veered right of the runway centreline. The accident killed all five crew and the two passengers (a BEA official and his wife) on board, and the aircraft was destroyed.

Investigation and cause
A Public inquiry was convened to investigate the accident, during which it emerged that the airport's approach lighting system may have been switched off at the time of the aircraft's landing attempt. The inquiry also heard evidence regarding a bent screwdriver that had been found in the wreckage, but as this had been removed by an airport worker before its position in the wreckage had been recorded, the likelihood of the object jamming the flight controls could not be assessed. At the conclusion of the inquiry, while it made recommendations regarding the security of aircraft crash sites and tool control during maintenance, and suggested that records be kept of when airport approach lighting was switched on or off, no official cause of the accident was determined.

References

 "The Seventeenth S.B.A.C. Display", Flight, 7 September 1956, pp. 429–438
 "Belfast Tragedy", Flight, 1 November 1957, p. 669.
 "B.E.A. Viscount 802 Loss", Flight 9 May 1958, p. 646.
 "B.E.A. Viscount Accident Unexplained", Flight 18 July 1958, p. 91.
 "Viscount Mystery", Flight 24 October 1958, p. 674.

Aviation accidents and incidents in 1957
Aviation accidents and incidents in Northern Ireland
Accidents and incidents involving the Vickers Viscount
19571023
1957 disasters in the United Kingdom
1957 in Northern Ireland
20th century in Belfast
October 1957 events in the United Kingdom